Lucien Pothier (8 February 1891 – 6 July 1941) was a Belgian wrestler. He competed in the Greco-Roman heavyweight event at the 1924 Summer Olympics.

References

External links
 

1891 births
1941 deaths
Olympic wrestlers of Belgium
Wrestlers at the 1924 Summer Olympics
Belgian male sport wrestlers
Place of birth missing